Laila El-Haddad is a Palestinian author and public speaker based in the United States. She frequently lectures on Gaza, the intersection of food and politics, and contemporary Islam. She is also a policy advisor with Al-Shabaka: the Palestinian Policy Network.

She is  the author of Gaza Mom: Palestine, Politics, Parenting, and Everything In Between (in India, Gaza Mama: Politics and Parenting in Palestine), co-author of the critically acclaimed The Gaza Kitchen: A Palestinian Culinary Journey and co-editor of Gaza Unsilenced.

Personal life and background

El-Haddad was born in Kuwait in 1978. She was raised primarily in Saudi Arabia, where her parents worked, and she spent her summers in Gaza. She traveled to the United States to attend Duke University, and then went on to receive her MPP from Harvard's Kennedy School of Government, where she was awarded the Clinton Scholarship for Palestinian graduate students. She moved to Gaza to work as a journalist while her husband remained in the US.  The experience of constantly waiting, whether for documentation or for borders to open, informs her take on the issues that Palestinians face today. 

El-Haddad is married with one son and three daughters.

Life and career

From 2003 to 2007, El-Haddad was the Gaza correspondent for the al-Jazeera English website. She was praised for her extensive behind the scenes coverage of the Gaza Disengagement in 2005 and Palestinian parliamentary elections in 2006.

El-Haddad co-directed Tourist With A Typewriter Production Company's film Tunnel Trade, and she has contributed to the Beit-Sahur based Alternative Tourism Guide's Palestine guidebook.

She previously authored a blog called Raising Yousuf: Diary of a Mother Under Occupation also known as Gaza Mom. The website won the Brass Crescent Award for "best Mideast blog", was nominated as best Mideast blog in the 2007 Bloggies Award, was selected as Blog of the Day by www.BlogAwards.com, and was chosen as a Blog of Note by www.Blogspot.com. In 2010, she "curated" her work, compiling choice blog entries and other writing into a book, Gaza Mom: Palestine, Politics, Parenting, and Everything In Between.

El-Haddad writes about her daily life with a wry sense of humor, making the situation that Gazans and Palestinians face much more personal
and portraying Palestinians in a more sympathetic light than they are often presented in. She has been published in The Washington Post, The International Herald Tribune, The Baltimore Sun, New Statesman, Le Monde diplomatique, and The Electronic Intifada, among others, and she has been a guest on al Jazeera, NPR stations, CNN, and the BBC.

Writing

El-Haddad has published two books. Gaza Mom: Palestine, Politics, Parenting, and Everything In Between, published in 2010, is a compilation of El-Haddad's blogs and other writing about her daily life as she covers the story of Gaza while living it and trying to explain it to her children. In 2013, she co-authored The Gaza Kitchen: A Palestinian Culinary Journey with Maggie Schmitt; this cookbook of recipes from across the Gaza Strip both explores the food heritage of the region and tells the stories of Gazan women and men to portray the reality of Palestinian life from a personal perspective.
She was also featured on the CNN travel show 'Parts Unknown with Anthony Bourdain' 'Jerusalem Episode'. In it she shows Bourdain around Gaza's rich food culture.

References

External links
 "'Disengagement from Justice,' Washington Post, July 2005."

Palestinian journalists
The Guardian journalists
Year of birth missing (living people)
Living people
Harvard Kennedy School alumni
Duke University alumni